Content Nausea is the fourth studio album by American indie rock band Parquet Courts, released on November 28, 2014 under the name Parkay Quarts. Recorded chiefly by bandmates Andrew Savage and Austin Brown, the album was released less than six months after its predecessor, Sunbathing Animal.

Background and recording
Bass guitarist Sean Yeaton and drummer Max Savage were largely absent from the recording process for Content Nausea, due to Yeaton starting a family and Savage focusing on a mathematics degree.

The album was recorded, mixed and mastered in less than two weeks, on a four-track cassette, by vocalists and guitarists Andrew Savage and Austin Brown.

Reception

In a positive review for Pitchfork, Mike Powell wrote: "Nausea is easier to listen to than Sunbathing Animal in part because it seems less ambitious. Four of its tracks are around a minute long; one is a so-so cover of "These Boots are Made For Walkin’" (itself a punk staple as ubiquitous as the safety pin); one is basically spoken word over noise—a reminder that for all the band’s nervous intensity, they’re basically bookworms."

Track listing

References

2014 albums
Parquet Courts albums
What's Your Rupture? albums